The Civic Party is a liberal democratic political party in Hong Kong.

Civic Party may also refer to:
Civic Party (Belarus), defunct political party
Civic Party of Kazakhstan, defunct political party, formerly part of the Agrarian and Industrial Union of Workers Block
Civic Party of Moldova, defunct political party
Civic Party of Montenegro, liberal-centrist party in Montenegro
Civic Party of Montreal, former municipal political party in Quebec, Canada
Civic Party of Switzerland, alternative name for the Conservative Democratic Party
Cork Civic Party, active 1945–66 in Cork, Ireland
Hungarian Civic Party, major right-wing conservative party in Hungary
Hungarian Civic Party (Romania), political party for Romania's Hungarian ethnic minority

See also
Civil Party (disambiguation)
National Civic Party (disambiguation), a name shared by parties in different countries